The 2021 season was the Houston Texans' 20th season in the National Football League, and their first and only under head coach David Culley. For the first time since 2010, long-time defensive end J. J. Watt was not on the roster, as he had signed with the Arizona Cardinals on March 5, 2021, reuniting him with former Texans teammate DeAndre Hopkins, who was traded to the Cardinals the season prior. It also was the first time since 2013 without long-time head coach Bill O'Brien, as he was fired just four games into the 2020 season when the Texans began 0–4.

In addition, Deshaun Watson, the starting quarterback since 2017, was inactive the entire season due to a fallout with team management and several allegations of sexual assault. Though he was never released, suspended, or placed on any reserve list, he was ruled out each week for "non-injury-related" reasons. Veteran free agent signing Tyrod Taylor and rookie Davis Mills split time as the starting quarterback in Watson's stead throughout the season. Due to injury and poor performance by Taylor, Mills would be the starting quarterback for most of the season. Mills would finish the season with 2,664 passing yards, breaking the franchise record for most passing yards in a season by a rookie quarterback.

After winning their season opener against the Jacksonville Jaguars, the Texans would go on an eight-game losing streak before winning against the Tennessee Titans in week 11. After a Week 13 loss to the Indianapolis Colts, the Texans became the first team to be eliminated from playoff contention for the second consecutive year. With a 41–29 upset victory over the Los Angeles Chargers in week 16, the Texans matched their win total from the previous season, at four.

Following the season, head coach David Culley and offensive coordinator Tim Kelly were fired. Watson would also be traded to the Cleveland Browns in the following off-season.

Offseason

Signings

Re-Signings

Departures

Trades

Draft

NFL Top 100

NFL Network began announcing its annual top 100 list on August 15, 2021. Two players were named to the list.

Staff

Final roster

Preseason

Schedule

Game summaries

Week 1: at Green Bay Packers

Tyrod Taylor started at quarterback for the Texans, leading the team 57 yards downfield on his first drive, before the drive stalled at Green Bay's 19-yard line; the Texans would settle for a 37-yard field goal from Ka'imi Fairbairn to take a 3–0 lead. This was the only drive Taylor would play, going 4-of-4 for 40 yards. Rookie quarterback Davis Mills entered the game on Houston's next drive, being sacked once and throwing an incomplete pass as the Texans went three-and-out. After the rough start, Mills would settle in and lead the Texans on two scoring drives, resulting in ten points. Late in the 2nd quarter, Green Bay quarterback Jordan Love was sacked and fumbled the ball, with Jaleel Johnson recovering for Houston at the Green Bay 17-yard line; however, Mills would throw an interception on the very next play. Mills would briefly appear in the 2nd half before Jeff Driskel took over midway in the 3rd quarter. Driskel would remain the Texans' quarterback for the rest of the game; Driskel would only complete one pass out of six attempts for 2 yards. Late in the 4th quarter, Houston cornerback Tremon Smith intercepted a Kurt Benkert pass.

The three Texans' quarterbacks finished with a combined 16/32 for 149 yards, no touchdowns, and one interception.

Week 2: at Dallas Cowboys

The Cowboys received the opening kickoff, with Houston defensive end Jacob Martin causing a fumble on the third play of the game, with Charles Omenihu recovering it for the Texans. Tyrod Taylor started at quarterback for Houston, leading the offense on a short drive that ended with a 2-yard touchdown run from Mark Ingram II Taylor would play for most of the 1st quarter before Davis Mills came in with 0:22 left; Taylor finished 2-of-5 for 10 yards. In the third quarter, cornerback Lonnie Johnson Jr. intercepted a Ben DiNucci pass and returned it 53 yards for a pick six touchdown. Shyheim Carter picked off a DiNucci pass in the 4th quarter, returning it 5 yards to the 50-yard line. Jeff Driskel took over at quarterback on the next drive, leading the team down to the red zone before the drive stalled, settling for a 24-yard field goal from Ka'imi Fairbairn to give the Texans a 20–14 lead. Late in the 4th quarter, with the Cowboys trying to win the game, strong safety Terrence Brooks intercepted DiNucci, sealing the victory for the Texans.

The Texans only had 220 yards of offense versus the Cowboys' 308, but committed no turnovers while Dallas turned the ball over four times. The three Houston quarterbacks finished for a combined 13-of-23 for 131 yards.

Week 3: vs. Tampa Bay Buccaneers

Kicker Ka'imi Fairbairn suffered an injury during pregame warmups, with safety Justin Reid handling the kickoffs for the Texans; Reid would not attempt any field goals or extra points, with the team opting to go for it on 4th down and attempt a two-point conversion after touchdowns. Tyrod Taylor started at quarterback and played until midway of the 2nd quarter. Taylor left the game after losing a fumble on a sack, finishing 6-of-9 for 31 yards. Davis Mills would play for the rest of the game, going 10-of-27 for 106 yards with two touchdowns, but also threw three interceptions and lost a fumble. Taylor and Mills finished for a combined 16-of-36 for 115 yards, two touchdowns, and three interceptions.

Regular season

Schedule
The Texans' 2021 schedule was announced on May 12.

Note: Intra-division opponents are in bold text.

Game summaries

Week 1: vs. Jacksonville Jaguars

The Texans kicked off the 2021 season and the David Culley era at home against AFC South rival the Jacksonville Jaguars and Trevor Lawrence, the first overall pick in the 2021 NFL Draft. The Texans' defense picked off Lawrence three times while the offense committed no turnovers. With the win, the Texans started 1–0 for the first time since 2016; additionally, the Texans were the only AFC South team to win during week 1.

Week 2: at Cleveland Browns

Starting quarterback Tyrod Taylor suffered a hamstring injury during the first half, with rookie Davis Mills replacing him for the second half.

Week 3: vs. Carolina Panthers

Rookie quarterback Davis Mills started his first NFL game as Tyrod Taylor was still recovering from a hamstring injury. After a slow start, Mills would lead the offense on a quick scoring drive to end the half with a 1-yard pass to Anthony Miller, but kicker Joey Slye missed the extra point. The offense would continue to be inconsistent throughout the 2nd half, with Mills constantly being pressured by Carolina's defense.

Week 4: at Buffalo Bills

The Texans committed five turnovers, with quarterback Davis Mills throwing four interceptions and tight end Jordan Akins losing a fumble and only had 109 yards of total offense. The Texans were shutout for the first time since 2016. The 40 point loss is also the largest in franchise history.

Week 5: vs. New England Patriots

The Texans had a 22–9 lead early in the 3rd quarter, but the Patriots would score 16 unanswered points, including Nick Folk's game-winning field goal with 17 seconds left in the 4th. Houston kicker Ka'imi Fairbairn missed two extra point attempts and a 56-yard field goal.

Week 6: at Indianapolis Colts

Week 7: at Arizona Cardinals

With the loss, the Texans' dropped to 1–6, losing their sixth game in a row. Following the game, head coach David Culley announced that quarterback Tyrod Taylor, who suffered a hamstring injury in week 2, would be returning to practice during the week.

Week 8: vs. Los Angeles Rams

Week 9: at Miami Dolphins

Week 11: at Tennessee Titans

Houston only had 190 yards of total offense compared to Tennessee's 420, but the Titans turned the ball over five times during the game and turned it over on downs twice. Tennessee quarterback Ryan Tannehill threw four interceptions, three of which happened in Houston territory. During a punt return, Chester Rogers muffed a punt that was recovered by Tremon Smith for Houston at the Tennessee 5-yard line.

Week 12: vs. New York Jets

Week 13: vs. Indianapolis Colts

Starting quarterback Tyrod Taylor was benched in the third quarter in favor of rookie Davis Mills. Taylor finished 5-of-13 for 45 yards with an interception. With the loss, the Texans were the first team to be eliminated from playoff contention. This loss also marked the first time in franchise history the Texans were shut out at home during the regular season, and their second home shutout loss after their 30–0 Wild Card Round loss to the Kansas City Chiefs in the 2015 season.

Week 14: vs. Seattle Seahawks

At the end of the first half, kicker Ka'imi Fairbairn made a 61-yard field goal, setting a franchise record for longest field goal made.

Week 15: at Jacksonville Jaguars

With the win, the Texans swept the Jacksonville Jaguars for the fourth season in a row. This was also the first victory for rookie quarterback Davis Mills.

Week 16: vs. Los Angeles Chargers

The Houston Texans hosted the Los Angeles Chargers for the penultimate home game of the season, with both teams missing several players due to the NFL's COVID-19 protocols. The game was close for the first three quarters, but a 24-point fourth quarter by the Texans put the game out of reach for the Chargers, including scoring 14 unanswered points in under a minute. Running back Rex Burkhead finished the game with a career high 149 rushing yards, the most by a Texans' running back since Carlos Hyde in week 9 of the 2019 season. With the win, the Texans improved to 4–11, matching their win total from the previous season.

Week 17: at San Francisco 49ers

Week 18: vs. Tennessee Titans

Standings

Division

Conference

Statistics

Team

Individual

Source:

See also
2007 Atlanta Falcons season, whose quarterback, Michael Vick, was suspended due to personal conduct reasons but not released.

References

External links
 

Houston
Houston Texans seasons
Houston Texans